Open circuit may refer to:

Open-circuit scuba, a type of SCUBA-diving equipment where the user breathes from the set and then exhales to the surroundings without recycling the exhaled air
Open-circuit test, a method used in electrical engineering to determine the impedance in the excitation branch of a real transformer
Open-circuit voltage, the difference of electrical potential between two terminals of a device when there is no external load connected
An electrical circuit is an "open circuit" if it lacks a complete path between the terminals of its power source

See also
Closed-circuit (disambiguation)
Short circuit (disambiguation)
Open system (disambiguation)